Gualdino Mauro dos Santos Barreto (born 13 July 2000), sometimes known as Maú, is a Santomean footballer who plays as a winger for Fabril and the São Tomé and Príncipe national team.

International career
Gualdino Mauro made his professional debut with the São Tomé and Príncipe national team in a 1–0 2021 Africa Cup of Nations qualification loss to Ghana on 18 November 2019.

References

External links
 
 
 
 

2000 births
Living people
People from São Tomé
São Tomé and Príncipe footballers
São Tomé and Príncipe international footballers
Association football wingers
Campeonato de Portugal (league) players
São Tomé and Príncipe expatriate footballers
São Tomé and Príncipe expatriates in Portugal
Expatriate footballers in Portugal